Holy Trinity Church is a Grade II* listed parish church in the Church of England in Wentworth, South Yorkshire.

History

The church was built by William Wentworth-Fitzwilliam, 6th Earl Fitzwilliam in memory of his parents. Construction started in 1872 and the building was designed by John Loughborough Pearson. It was completed in 1876 and consecrated on 31 July 1877 by the Archbishop of York. On opening, Old Holy Trinity Church, Wentworth was closed.

Stained glass
East window 1888 by Clayton and Bell
West window by Charles Eamer Kempe

Organ
The church contains a pipe organ by Henry Willis dating from 1877. It was restored in 1981 by Chalmers and Hyde. A specification of the organ can be found on the National Pipe Organ Register.

See also
Grade II* listed buildings in South Yorkshire
Listed buildings in Wentworth, South Yorkshire

References

Church of England church buildings in South Yorkshire
Grade II* listed churches in South Yorkshire
Holy Trinity Church